Baro is a small port town on the Niger in present Niger State (central Nigeria).

A crater on Mars has been named after Baro.

Transport 

Baro is also a railway town situated approximately 400 miles (650 km) up the Niger River at the limit of river navigation, subject to dredging. The railway terminal or station is on bar 0 (later corrupted to baro) which was the starting point of the Baro to Kano railway. The Baro to Kano railway was built by the Northern Nigerian Protectorate under Sir Fredrick Lugard from 1907-1911. The line was later amalgamated with the Lagos Government Railway built by the Lagos Colony (later Southern Nigerian Protectorate) to form one single national railway known as the Nigerian railway department in 1912.

See also 

 Railway stations in Nigeria

References 

Populated places in Niger State